The Directional Radio Tower Stuttgart-Möhringen is a  lattice steel tower for directional radio services of the EnBW AG on the area of the substation Stuttgart-Möhringen. The Directional Radio Tower Stuttgart-Möhringen was built in 1975 and is not accessible to the public.

See also
 List of towers

External links
 
 http://skyscraperpage.com/diagrams/?b47493
 Picture on Google-Maps

Buildings and structures in Stuttgart
Communication towers in Germany
Radio masts and towers in Germany
Towers completed in 1975
1975 establishments in West Germany